The Montgomery, Alabama Police Department was established in 1820. It employs about 524 sworn officers and another 200 support staff. It is headed by Chief of Police Ernest N. Finley.

History

Civil rights era

Organization
The department is divided into a number of divisions, which in turn have a number of bureaus.

The divisions are:
Administrative
Criminal Investigative
Municipal Jail
Patrol
Special Operations
Traffic
Training and Recruiting

Fallen Officers
Since its establishment in 1820, 25 officers of the Montgomery Police Department have been killed in the line of duty.

There has been 3 Montgomery Police Department Officers die while off-duty

See also
 Freedom Riders in Montgomery
 Shooting of Greg Gunn
 Killing of Bernard Whitehurst
 List of law enforcement agencies in Alabama

References

External links
Montgomery, Alabama Police Department 

Montgomery, Alabama
Municipal police departments of Alabama
1820 establishments in Alabama